The White River is a Missouri River tributary that flows  through the U.S. states of Nebraska and South Dakota. The name stems from the water's white-gray color, a function of eroded sand, clay, and volcanic ash carried by the river from its source near the Badlands.

It flows southeast then northeast past Fort Robinson and north of Crawford. It crosses into southwestern South Dakota and flows north across the Pine Ridge Indian Reservation, then northeast, receiving Wounded Knee Creek and flowing between units of Badlands National Park. It flows east-northeast and southeast at the northern edge of the reservation, forming the northern boundary of the reservation and the southern boundary of Buffalo Gap National Grassland.

The river sometimes has no surface flow due to the dry climate surrounding its badlands and prairie basin, though thunderstorms can cause brief intense flow. The river near Chamberlain flows year-round. As of 2001, the White River had generally good-quality water.

Industrial use
As of November 2019, TC Energy was applying for permits in the state to tap the White River to use water for the construction of Phase 4 of the Keystone pipeline, including camp construction to house transient construction workers.

See also

List of rivers of Nebraska
List of rivers of South Dakota

References

Works cited
Benke, Arthur C., ed., and Cushing, Colbert E., ed.; Galat, David L.; Berry, Charles R., Jr.; Peters, Edward J., and White, Robert G. (2005). "Chapter 10: Missouri River Basin" in Rivers of North America. Burlington, Massachusetts: Elsevier Academic Press. .

Rivers of Nebraska
Rivers of South Dakota
Tributaries of the Missouri River
Rivers of Dawes County, Nebraska
Rivers of Oglala Lakota County, South Dakota
Rivers of Pennington County, South Dakota
Rivers of Jackson County, South Dakota
Rivers of Jones County, South Dakota
Rivers of Mellette County, South Dakota
Rivers of Tripp County, South Dakota
Rivers of Lyman County, South Dakota